No. 198 Squadron was a Royal Air Force aircraft squadron that operated during the Second World War particularly in the ground attack role as the allies advanced through continental Europe. The RAFAC counterpart of the squadron resides in Hinckley, sharing its current HQ with 121 Squadron

History

No. 198 Squadron was formed at Rochford on 1 June 1917 with Avro 504K biplanes to teach pilots elementary night flying and later a comprehensive night flying course for home defence pilots. It disbanded at Rochford in September 1919.

The squadron reformed at RAF Digby as a fighter squadron equipped with the Hawker Typhoon on 8 December 1942. From March 1943 198 Squadron joined 609 Squadron at RAF Manston where it provided fighter-escorts to the twin-engined Westland Whirlwind fighter-bombers on sorties into continental Europe. Over the next nine months 198 Squadron and 609 Squadron were the only Typhoon units to operate full-time on escort duties for RAF and USAAF bombers and long-range fighter sweeps (code-named "Ramrods") over France, Belgium and the Netherlands; during these operations the squadron used long-range Typhoons each equipped with a cigar-shaped 45 imp gallon fuel tank mounted below each wing. In these roles the unit was very successful, becoming one of the top scoring Typhoon units.

During this time most of the other Typhoon units began to be equipped with bomb racks or RP-3 rocket rails and had started training to carry out ground attack operations in preparation for the cross-Channel invasion.

After building up a score of enemy aircraft destroyed the squadron changed role to ground attack at the beginning of 1944, when the Typhoons were fitted with RP-3 rockets.  In January 1944 the squadron became part of the Second Tactical Air Force's  "123 Airfield" (later known as 123 Wing), partnered with 609 Squadron. Initially 123 Airfield was commanded by New Zealander Wing Commander Desmond J. Scott.

The squadron lost several of its pilots during this re-organisation to bring them into line with 2nd TAF's established strength requirements, and the ground crew echelon was completely changed. Morale slumped for a short while, but soon picked up as the squadron became familiarised with its new role. In March 1944 Scott was replaced by Wg Cdr R. E. P Brooker and 123 Wing moved to an "Armament Practice Camp" (APC) at Llanbedr in Wales before moving in April to RAF Thorney Island in preparation for D-Day. After the landings the squadron was heavily involved in fighting around Caen using the rocket-equipped Typhoons against tanks and enemy positions. In July it moved to France and followed the advancing troops into the Netherlands and eventually moving to Wunstorf in Germany in May 1945. On 15 September 1945 the squadron was disbanded.

The RAF's top scoring Typhoon pilot was 198 Squadron's John Robert Baldwin, who claimed 15 aircraft shot down during 1942–44. Baldwin became commanding officer of the squadron in November 1943 and relinquished command in April 1944. He continued his association with 198 Squadron and ended the war as a Group Captain commanding No, 84 (Typhoon) Group.

Aircraft operated

Aircraft and pilot Losses

Commanding officers 1942 to 1945

See also
Second Tactical Air Force
Operation Jericho
Cap Arcona

References

Notes

Bibliography
 

 Shores, Christopher and Thomas, Chris. Second Tactical Air Force Volume One. Spartan to Normandy, June 1943 to June 1944. Hersham, Surrey, UK: Ian Allan Publishing Ltd, 2004. 
 Shores, Christopher and Thomas, Chris. Second Tactical Air Force Volume Two. Breakout to Bodenplatte July 1944 to January 1945. Hersham, Surrey, UK: Ian Allan Publishing Ltd, 2005. 
 Thomas, Chris and Shores, Christopher. The Typhoon and Tempest Story. London: Arms and Armour Press, 1988. .

External links

THE ASSOCIATION OF 198 SQUADRON RAF PILOTS & GROUND CREWS; 198 Sqn History

198 Squadron
Aircraft squadrons of the Royal Air Force in World War II
Military units and formations established in 1917
1917 establishments in England